Juanita Havill (born 1949) is an American children's picture book author best known for the Jamaica books. She has also written a young adult novel, Eyes Like Willy's. She was born in Evansville, Indiana and raised in Mount Carmel, Illinois. She is currently living in Arizona.

Bibliography 
I Heard It from Alice Zucchini: Poems About the Garden (2006)
Eyes Like Willy's (2004)
Jamaica's Blue Marker (2003)
Brianna, Jamaica, and the Dance of Spring (2002)
Jamaica and the Substitute Teacher (2001)
Jamaica's Find (1998), Ezra Jack Keats New Writer Award (1987)
Jamaica and Brianna (1996)
Jennifer, Too (1995)
Saving Owen's Toad (1994)
Kentucky Troll (1993)
Leona and Ike (1992)
The Magic Fort (1991)
It Always Happens to Leona (1989)
You Always in My Mind Like Always

References

External links 
 Interview with Juanita Havill, All About Kids! TV Series #9 (1988)

American children's writers
Havill family
Living people
1949 births